John Charles Sheppard (born 12 July 1952) is a former Australian politician. He was born in Hobart, Tasmania, and holds a Bachelor of Education. In 1995, he was elected to the Tasmanian House of Assembly representing Franklin for the Labor Party, following a countback proceeding from the resignation of Michael Aird. Sheppard was defeated in 1996.

References

1952 births
Living people
Members of the Tasmanian House of Assembly
Australian Labor Party members of the Parliament of Tasmania